Kaempferol-3-O-rutinoside is a bitter-tasting flavonol glycoside. It can be isolated from the rhizomes of the fern Selliguea feei.

References

External links 
 Kaempferol-3-O-rutinoside at www.phenol-explorer.eu

Flavonol rutinosides
Bitter compounds